Eupleura sulcidentata, common name the sharp-ribbed drill, is a species of sea snail, a marine gastropod mollusk in the family Muricidae, the murex snails or rock snails.

Description
This is a small species, reaching only up to 25mm.

Overall shape is that of a fairly typical murex in miniature, though its varices ("ribs") are spaced at approximately 180° apart, rather than the ~120° more common in murexes. The varices have a wavy appearance and a sharp-looking edge. In-between the varices are smaller bumps or nodes. Color is usually whitish or off-white, occasionally buff or even brown. Sometimes a brown stripe is present on the upper part of each whorl.

The sharp-ribbed drill is a carnivore and, as the name "drill" implies, it bores holes into the shells of other mollusks using its radular teeth.

Distribution
This species is known to occur in the Gulf of Mexico and Caribbean Sea.

References

Muricidae
Gastropods described in 1890